Directorate of Intelligence may refer to:

 CIA Directorate of Intelligence, former name for the CIA's Directorate of Analysis
 Directorate of Intelligence (United Kingdom)
 Directorate of Military Intelligence (Ireland)
 FBI Directorate of Intelligence, a unit of the FBI's Intelligence Branch

See also
 Direction Nationale du Renseignement et des Enquêtes Douanières, France